Liushan may refer to these places in China:

Liushan Subdistrict (刘山街道), a subdistrict of Xinfu District, Fushun, Liaoning

Towns
Liushan, Guangxi (流山), in Liuzhou, Guangxi
Liushan, Henan (留山), in Nanzhao County, Henan
Liushan, Shandong (柳山), in Linqu County, Shandong

See also
Liu Shan (207–271), Shu Han emperor
Liu Shan (Ming dynasty) (died 1427), Ming dynasty general